The Circuit de Dakar Baobabs is a racing circuit located near the village of Sindia in Senegal.

It is the first permanent racing circuit of West Africa and homologated by the FIA in 2009. The track is used mainly for local races and championships, including the Dakar 6 hours race, organised for the 30th time in 2010.

References

External links 
 Homepage

Motorsport venues in Senegal